Semra Aksu Bayan (born 31 May 1962) is a Turkish sprinter. She competed in the women's 100 metres at the 1984 Summer Olympics.

References

External links
 

1962 births
Living people
Athletes (track and field) at the 1984 Summer Olympics
Athletes (track and field) at the 1988 Summer Olympics
Turkish female sprinters
Turkish female hurdlers
Olympic athletes of Turkey
Sportspeople from İzmir
Mediterranean Games silver medalists for Turkey
Mediterranean Games medalists in athletics
Athletes (track and field) at the 1987 Mediterranean Games